Max Leichter (20 April 1920 – 11 February 1981) was a German wrestler. He competed in two events at the 1952 Summer Olympics.

References

1920 births
1981 deaths
German male sport wrestlers
Olympic wrestlers of Germany
Wrestlers at the 1952 Summer Olympics
Sportspeople from Frankfurt
20th-century German people